Cranberry Inlet (also known as New Inlet or Toms River Inlet) was an inlet connecting Barnegat Bay with the Atlantic Ocean in Ocean County, New Jersey. It has been closed since 1812.

Geography
Cranberry Inlet separated Squan Beach from Island Beach, both today comprising the Barnegat Peninsula.  The inlet was approximately located at the boundary between Ortley Beach and Seaside Heights, nearly opposite the mouth of the Toms River.

It was described in 1834 as,

History
In 1767, Cranberry Inlet is mentioned in the boundary description of the legislation creating Dover Township. The former inlet is also mentioned in the act setting Berkeley Township off from Dover Township.

In 1874, Former Speaker of the New Jersey General Assembly Edwin Salter wrote at length about Cranberry Inlet in Old Times in Old Monmouth:

Access to the upper part of Barnegat Bay was finally achieved in 1925 with the opening of the Point Pleasant Canal.

See also 
Barnegat Bay
Barnegat Peninsula
Island Beach
Squan Beach

References 

Inlets of New Jersey
Bodies of water of Ocean County, New Jersey